Leptospermum sericeum, commonly known as the silver tea tree, is a species of shrub that is endemic to the south-west of Western Australia. It has thin, firm bark, egg-shaped leaves with the narrower end towards the base, relatively large, pink flowers and fruit that fall from the plant with the seeds. It grows in windswept rock crevices near Esperance.

Description
The leaves are covered with a layer of silvery grey hairs, at least at first, sometimes becoming glabrous later. The flower buds have reddish brown bracts and bracteoles at the base but that fall off well before the flower opens. The remnants of the sepals remain attached to the fruit, but the fruit falls from the plant when the seeds mature.

Taxonomy and naming
Leptospermum sericeum was first described in 1806 by Jacques Labillardière who published the description in Novae Hollandiae Plantarum Specimen. Labillardière mistakenly gave the type location as "Capite van Diemen" (Tasmania). George Bentham considered it a synonym of Kunzea sericea Turcz. in Flora Australiensis, as did Joy Thompson in her 1990 paper in the journal Telopea. (Kunzea sericea is now considered to be a synonym of Kunzea pulchella.)

Distribution and habitat
Silver teatree grows in shallow soil in the crevices of windswept granite outcrops near Esperance, including on nearby islands.

Conservation status
This leptospermum is listed as "not threatened" by the Western Australian Government Department of Parks and Wildlife.

References

sericeum
Flora of Western Australia
Plants described in 1806
Taxa named by Jacques Labillardière